Heated may refer to:

 Heated (Big Sugar album), a 1998 rock album
 Heated (Sean T album), a 2000 hip hop album
 "Heated", a song by Beyoncé from Renaissance, 2022

See also

 Heat (disambiguation)
 Heater (disambiguation)